Parliamentary elections were held in Laos on 30 April 2006. The ruling Lao People's Revolutionary Party (LPRP) won 113 of the 115 seats in the sixth National Assembly.

Campaign
A total of 175 candidates contested the 115 seats, of which 173 were members of the LPRP.

Results

References

Elections in Laos
Laos
2006 in Laos
One-party elections
April 2006 events in Asia
Election and referendum articles with incomplete results